The 2017 Oceania Women's Sevens Championship is the seventh Oceania Women's Sevens tournament. It will be held in Suva, Fiji on 10–11 November 2017. The tournament serves as a qualifier for the 2018 Rugby World Cup Sevens, with the highest-placed team aside from Australia, Fiji and New Zealand advancing.

Teams

Pool stage
All times are Fiji Summer Time (UTC+13:00)

Pool A

Pool B

Knockout stage

5th-8th Place

Cup

 Note:

Standings

See also
 2018 Rugby World Cup Sevens qualifying – Women
 2017 Oceania Sevens Championship (men)

References

2017
2017 in Fijian rugby union
2017 in women's rugby union
2017 rugby sevens competitions
International rugby union competitions hosted by Fiji
Sport in Suva
Oceania Women's Sevens